Lonchura is a genus of the estrildid finch family, and includes munias (or minias) and mannikins. They are seed-eating birds that are found in South Asia from India, Bangladesh, Sri Lanka east to  Indonesia, Papua New Guinea, and the Philippines. The name mannikin is from Middle Dutch mannekijn 'little man' (also the source of the different bird name manakin).

Some of the Lonchura species were formerly placed in Spermestes.  Others have been placed in a genus of their own, Euodice.

Characteristics
They are small gregarious birds which feed mainly on seeds, usually in relatively open habitats, preferring to feed on the ground or on reeds of grasses. Several species have been noted to feed on algae such as Spirogyra.
  
The nest is a large domed grass structure into which four to ten white eggs are laid. Some species also build communal roosting nests for overnight rest.

The species in this genus are similar in size and structure, with stubby bills, stocky bodies and long tails. Most are 10–12 cm in length. Plumage is usually a combination of browns, black and white, with the sexes similar, but duller and less contrasted for immature birds.

The similarities within this group and the existence of subspecies with differing vocalisations and plumage mean that some races may be elevated to species status. African and Indian silverbill are now usually considered distinct species in the Genus Euodice, and the two races of black-throated munia are often also split.

The munias are popular in the bird trade and many freed or escaped birds have formed feral colonies in different pockets across the world.

The red munia Amandava amandava and green munia Amandava formosa also take the name munia, but are in the genus Amandava.

Taxonomy
The genus Lonchura was introduced by the English naturalist William Henry Sykes in 1832. The name combines the Ancient Greek lonkhē meaning "spear-head" or "lance" with oura meaning "tail". The type species was designated by Richard Bowdler Sharpe in 1890 as the scaly-breasted munia.

Species
The genus contains 27 species:

References

 
Bird genera
Taxa named by William Henry Sykes